Major-General Sir Charles Ernest Heath  (20 September 1854 – 23 October 1936) was a senior British Army officer.

Heath was born in Cheadle, Staffordshire, the son of Rev. Charles Harbord Heath, rector of Bucknall cum Bagnall, and Mary Anne Heath.

Heath commissioned into the Duke of Cornwall's Light Infantry in 1873. In 1890 he transferred to the Army Service Corps. Between 1905 and 1907 he was in charge of administration at Aldershot Garrison, before serving as Director of Transport and Remounts at Army Headquarters and the War Office from 1907 to 1911. Heath was made Companion of the Order of the Bath in the 1911 Coronation Honours, and he was elevated to Knight Commander in the 1916 Birthday Honours. He died in 1936.

He married Eleanor Russell, daughter of John Russell of County Limerick, in 1854. They had  three daughters and one son before she died in 1915. Their only son, Hugh Lester Heath, drowned in Canada in 1914 on the RMS Empress of Ireland. He married Mabel Frances, daughter of Colonel Frederick N. Miles, of the Bengal Staff Corps in 1916.  His second wife died in 1933.

References

1854 births
1936 deaths
British Army major generals
Military personnel from Staffordshire
British Army generals of World War I
Commanders of the Royal Victorian Order
Duke of Cornwall's Light Infantry officers
Knights Commander of the Order of the Bath
Royal Army Service Corps officers